Tessa Georgina Kennedy (born 6 December 1938) is a British interior designer, whose clients include multi-national corporations, royalty, celebrities and many European hotels, restaurants and clubs.  Her elopement with society portrait painter Dominick Elwes made headlines in 1957.

Early life
Kennedy was born in Guildford, Surrey, one of three daughters of Osijek-born Daška Ivanović (1915–2004), and her first husband Geoffrey Alexander Farrer Kennedy (1908–1996). She is a niece of diplomat and former Yugoslav shipping magnate Vane Ivanović and great-great-niece of Dušan Popović, one of the founders of Yugoslavia. She is a great-granddaughter of the British engineer, Sir Alexander Blackie Kennedy and granddaughter of Sir John MacFarlane Kennedy, as well as of industrialist Ivan Rikard Ivanović. Her mother was of Croatian Jewish and Serbian descent. After her parents' divorce in 1949, her mother remarried, to Neil McLean. Kennedy attended The Downs School from 1949 to 1952, then completed her grade school studies at the Oak Hall in Haslemere from 1952 to 1957. She studied at École des Beaux-Arts sometime in 1957.

Marriage
At age 18, Kennedy became a cause célèbre after she eloped with the painter Dominick Elwes.

On 27 November 1957, Geoffrey Kennedy obtained a restraining order against Elwes. However, the High Court Tipstaff was not authorized to apprehend Elwes in any place outside England and Wales. After attempting to wed in Scotland, while being pursued by the press, the young couple eloped to Havana, Cuba. Mobster Meyer Lansky provided accommodation for them at the Habana Riviera, and the couple were wed in a civil ceremony on 27 January 1958. When Castro's revolution threatened the stability of the country, they were forced to flee aboard a ferry, the S.S. City of Havana which took them to Miami via Stock Island and Key West. From Miami the couple flew to New York, where they applied for a marriage license on 31 March. The following day, they were wed at the Manhattan Supreme Court. On the 16 July, as the ship docked at Southampton, Elwes handed himself over to the authorities while waiting for charges against him to be heard. Elwes was eventually released from custody, but Kennedy was ordered to remain a ward of court.

Career
After studying at the École des Beaux-Arts in Paris, Kennedy started her career in the 1960s at the London design firm of David Mlinaric, whose clients included Mick Jagger and Eric Clapton. In 1968, after spending three years working as partner with Mlinaric, she won a competition to design the Grosvenor House Hotel, launching her own company with Michael Sumner that same year. In 1986, she reformed as Tessa Kennedy Design, Ltd., a company which has won several design accolades. Her clients have included De Beers, Stanley Kubrick, George Harrison, King Hussein of Jordan and London hotels Claridge's, The Berkeley, and The Ritz for which she was voted Designer of the Year. Kennedy also renovated rooms at director Michael Winner's Woodland House.

A member of the British Interior Design Association (BIDA), Kennedy was the first woman to work in Saudi Arabia with her own company. Following two years as President of the International Society of Interior Designers in Britain and three years on the International Board, she made a Fellow of the International Interior Design Association (IIDA).

Personal life
With Elwes, Kennedy had three sons: film producer Cassian Elwes, artist Damian Elwes and actor Cary Elwes. By her second husband, the Hollywood film producer Elliott Kastner (January 7, 1930 – June 30, 2010), she has a son and a daughter, Dillon and Milica (d. 2021)

Bibliography

 
 
 
 
 Spiegel: The Man Behind the Pictures by Andrew Sinclair. Weidenfeld and Nicolson (1987)
 Who's Who in Interior Design by Barons Who's Who (1988)
 The Decorator by Florence de Dampierre. Rizzoli (1989)
 ABC: The First Name in Entertainment by Allen Eyles. Burgess Hill Cinema Theatre Assoc. [U.A.] (1993)
 Empowered Spaces: Architects & Designers at Home and at Work by Carol Soucek King. Rizzoli (1993)
 The Bedroom by Diane Berger (photography by Fritz von der Schulenburg). Abbeyville Press (1995)
 Designing with Tile, Stone & Brick: The Creative Touch by Carol Soucek King. PBC International (1995)
 Classic Meets Contemporary by Fleur Rossdale & Henrietta Spencer-Churchill. Rizzoli (1998)
 Influential Interiors by Suzanne Trocmé. Clarkson Potter (1999)
 Domestic Bliss: Simple Ways to Add Style to Your Life by Rita Konig. Fireside (2003)
 Sam Spiegel by Natasha Fraser-Cavassoni. Simon and Schuster (2003)
 The New Curtain Book: Master-Classes with Today's Top Designers by Stephanie Hoppen & Fritz Von der Schulenburg. Allen & Unwin (2003)
 Almanac of Architecture & Design by James P Cramer & Jennifer Evans Yankopolus. Greenway Group, (2005)
 100 Hotels & Resorts: Destinations that Lift the Spirit by Howard J. Wolff, Allison Wimberly, Tong & Goo. Images Pub. (2008)

References

External links
The Telegraph
The Berkeley
Andrew Martin official website
Draperies & Window Coverings
Homes & Garden s; accessed 5 May 2014
The Gainesville Sun, 19 July 1981
The New York Times, 10 May 2002; accessed 5 May 2014.

1938 births
British alumni of the École des Beaux-Arts
English interior designers
English people of Scottish descent
People of Anglo-Irish descent
English people of Croatian-Jewish descent
English people of Serbian descent
Living people